Arbieto is a location in the Cochabamba Department in central Bolivia. It is the seat of Arbieto Municipality, the third municipal section of Esteban Arce Province. At the time of census 2001 it had a population of 1,347.

See also 
 Ignacio de Arbieto

References

External links
 Map of Esteban Arce Province

Populated places in Cochabamba Department